The Eastern Moods of Ahmed Abdul-Malik is the fifth album by double bassist and oud player Ahmed Abdul-Malik featuring performances recorded in 1963 and originally released on the Prestige label.

Track listing
All compositions by Ahmed Abdul-Malik except where noted
 "Summertime" (George Gershwin, Ira Gershwin, DuBose Heyward) - 10:19    
 "Ancient Scene" - 7:16    
 "Magrebi" - 5:18    
 "Sa-Ra-Ga' Ya-Hindi" - 9:47     
 "Shoof Habebe" - 5:17

Personnel
Ahmed Abdul-Malik - bass, oud
Bilal Abdurrahman - alto saxophone, clarinet, Korean reed flute, percussion
William Henry Allen - bass, percussion

References

Prestige Records albums
Ahmed Abdul-Malik albums
1963 albums
Albums recorded at Van Gelder Studio
Albums produced by Ozzie Cadena